Thomas D. Ourada is a former member of the Wisconsin State Assembly.

Biography
Ourada was born on December 17, 1958 in Antigo, Wisconsin. He graduated from Marquette University in 1981 and attended the University of Kentucky.

Career
Ourada was first elected to the Assembly in 1984. In 1999, Ourada resigned from the Assembly. A special election was held to fill his vacancy, won by Sarah Waukau. Ourada is a Republican.

References

People from Antigo, Wisconsin
Republican Party members of the Wisconsin State Assembly
Marquette University alumni
University of Kentucky alumni
1958 births
Living people